The 2015 Gilgit-Baltistan Assembly elections were held on 8 June 2015. Elections were held in 24 constituencies, each electing one member to the 2nd Gilgit-Baltistan Legislative Assembly. 269 candidates contested these elections, either representing one of the political parties of Gilgit-Baltistan (at the time of the 2020 elections) or being an independent candidate.

618,364 voters in Gilgit-Baltistan had the ability to exercise their right to vote in the elections and were able to vote across the province. 329,475 of the people registered to vote were male and 288,889 were female (a gender gap of 8%).

Background 

In 1970, the Gilgit Agency, Baltistan District, and the princely states of Hunza and Nagar were merged into a single administrative unit, called the "Federally Administered Northern Areas", often shortened to "FANA", or "Northern Areas". The Northern Areas were governed directly from Islamabad through the "Ministry of Kashmir Affairs and Northern Areas".

In 2009, the Government of Pakistan passed "The Gilgit-Baltistan Empowerment and Self-governance Order, 2009, and the President of Pakistan Asif Ali Zardari. This order renamed the Northern Areas as "Gilgit-Baltistan" and gave it a limited amount of internal autonomy within Pakistan and self-governance by allowing the people of Gilgit-Baltistan to have elections, where they could elect members of the "Gilgit-Baltistan Legislative Assembly". The position "Chief Minister of Gilgit-Baltistan" was also made. The Assembly would have five-year-long terms.

The first Gilgit-Baltistan elections were held in 2009, and the Pakistan Peoples Party, who then ruled at the federal level as well, won the election by a large margin and formed the government, and Syed Mehdi Shah became the first Chief Minister of Gilgit-Baltistan.

Campaign and Polling 
495 candidates from different political parties and Independents submitted their nomination papers out of which 50 nominations were rejected. 445 candidates took part in elections. Parties like Pakistan Muslim League (N), Pakistan Tehreek-e-Insaf and Pakistan Peoples Party stood candidates on all 24 assembly seats.

Polling took place on June 8, 2015 without any break from morning 8 am to evening 4 pm. Total number of 1143 polling stations were set up across the province. Out of 1143 polling stations, 282 were declared highly sensitive, while 269 polling stations were declared sensitive. About 5500 Military Soldiers along with 4356 policemen were deployed to perform security duties to make peaceful polling across the province.

Results
Pakistan Muslim League (N) emerged as the majority party by winning 15 out of 24 general seats. Taking into account the 4 out of 6 women seats and 2 out of 3 technocrat seats that they successfully gained, their seats increased to 21. They won a lopsided majority in the assembly.

Aftermath 
The newly elected assembly members took oath on 24 June 2015. Hafiz Hafeezur Rehman was elected as 2nd Chief Minister of Gilgit Baltistan unopposed. He took oath on 26 June 2015.

Notes

References

External links
Election Pakistan, retrieved 19 October 2018

Elections in Gilgit-Baltistan
2015 elections in Pakistan